In the United States about 10% of the population, 33 million people, live within 900 meters of a high traffic road High-traffic roads are commonly identified as being host to more than 50,000 vehicles per day, which is a source of toxic vehicle pollutants. Previous studies have found correlations between exposure to vehicle pollutants and certain diseases such as asthma, lung and heart disease, and cancer among others. Car pollutants include carbon monoxide, nitrogen oxides, particulate matter (fine dusts and soot), and toxic air pollutants  While these pollutants affect the general health of populations, they are known to also have specific adverse effects on expectant mothers and their fetuses. The purpose of this article is to outline how vehicular pollutants affect the health of expectant mothers and the adverse health effects these exposure have on the adult.

Population characteristics
In Los Angeles County, researchers found a higher risk in premature birth (10-20%) and low birth weight for infants whose mothers lived near high traffic areas  Studies conducted on populations living near the 405 and 710 interstates in Southern California found their exposure to particulate vehicle emissions to be almost 25 times higher than for people living 1000 ft from the freeways. This research also concluded that particulate vehicle emissions are more toxic to children's health than other particles such as Carbon Monoxide and Nitrogen Dioxide

Dangers of vehicle emissions

Carbon monoxide
Carbon monoxide (CO) is directly released from motor vehicles engines, which are a major source of this pollutant in the LA Basin 5. CO inhaled by pregnant women may threaten the unborn child's growth and mental development. Because CO competes with Oxygen to achieve dispersion throughout the blood stream, fetal hypoxia (lack of oxygen) may result at high levels of maternal CO exposure, however the exact amount of exposure of CO to become a fetal threat is unknown  High levels of carbon monoxide are also found in cigarettes, it is advised that pregnant women avoid smoking so as to not run the risk of affecting their child's growth or mental development. For further information on Carbon Monoxide and its effects on human health please see, Carbon monoxide poisoning.

Nitrogen oxides
Nitrogen oxides (NO) are common air pollutants found throughout most of the United States. You can be exposed to these oxides by breathing polluted air, which is most commonly found in areas with heavy motor vehicle traffic  Exposure to high levels of Nitrogen oxides damages tissues of the throat and upper respiratory tract and can interfere with the body's ability to carry oxygen. High exposure to nitrogen dioxide may cause fetal mutations, damage a developing fetus, and decrease a woman's ability to become pregnant. Studies have also shown that higher exposures to NO inhibit embryo development during both traditional pregnancies and artificial inseminations

Particulate matter
Examples of particulate matter include ash from smoke in campfires, dust particles around your house, and smoke coming from car exhaust pipes; in areas close to freeways this is a problem. A study conducted on European women indicated that higher exposure to particulate matter during the initial first weeks of their pregnancy resulted in low birth weight babies  This toxin is also considered to be the most dangerous of the three because it can be basically anything small enough to be inhaled. This may also be due to the fact that brain growth begins within the first month of conception.

Low-birth weight (LBW), and preterm delivery
A previous study conducted in the Los Angeles Basin of Southern California reported a consistent association between levels of CO and particulate matter during the first trimester and the last six weeks prior to birth and risk of preterm birth. Prematurity in babies is accompanied by an array of health complications. Children born prematurely are at highest risk for developing Infant respiratory distress syndrome, gastrointestinal, and hematologic diseases, central nervous system (CNS) problems such as hearing loss, are more prone to infections, and at risk for hearing and vision loss.

Babies born of low weight are also at risk for respiratory, gastrointestinal, cardiac, CNS, infection and vision problems. These gestational issues persist until the adult years for most children and result in high blood pressure, Type II Diabetes, and other heart diseases.

Prematurity and Low Birth Weight caused by air pollution also affects fetal brain development. This is of importance since lack of proper brain development will not allow a child's brain to form proper synapse connections which will negatively affect the child's speech, learning abilities, and social skills.

Long-term and short-term effects on babies
Exposure to vehicle air pollutants has been noted as primary cause for infant mortality and morbidity, and is also argued to be a cause of chronic diseases such as asthma in child and adulthood

Asthma
The number of children affected by asthma has increased in past decades the point where it is now the most chronic illness in children and the most common cause of children hospitalizations in the U.S. causing it to also be a number one contributor to school absences Excessive school absences ultimately affect the child's learning ability, and decrease their time to socialize with kids their age. It is not uncommon for children who suffer from asthma to oftentimes repeat grades due to failure to keep up academically.

Respiratory problems
Studies have found that children who are exposed to higher levels of car pollutants report higher respiratory problems including wheezing, ear and throat infections and have a higher incidence of physician-diagnosed asthma.

Cancer
Children living in close proximity to high traffic areas are also eight times more likely to develop leukemia compared to children who do not  This finding indicates that children who develop cancer as a result of traffic exposure will also spend more time in the hospital. This is not only a cause of school absences, but also a time of trauma for a child who is constantly visiting providers for treatment. Children with cancer have a harder time keeping up with school and keeping up with their friends

Traffic exposure and autism
Autism is a spectrum of disorders that range from a severe inability to communicate and some mental disabilities to milder symptoms such as attention disorders. Some claims exist that the incidence of autism is higher for babies whose mothers spend time in ‘high traffic pollution’ areas compared to mothers who spend their pregnancy in cleaner air. In a recent study conducted by UCLA, air pollutant levels were measured for mothers who had children with autism and then compared to air pollutant levels in environments for mothers who had children without autism. This study found that babies who were exposed to higher levels of pollutants while in the womb had a 10% higher risk of autism than babies who had low levels of exposure; another finding from this study is that fine particulates had the strongest association with autism

See also 
 Environmental impact of transport
 List of most-polluted cities by particulate matter concentration

References

External links
Zero To Three - information on child brain development

Air pollution in the United States
Smog
Transport and the environment
Health and transport
Human pregnancy